Finland and the United States currently have good relations. The United States was one of the first countries to recognize Finland after it declared independence in 1917, and officially established diplomatic relations in 1920. Due to World War II and Soviet pressure, relations were suspended between 1942 and 1945 before being raised to embassy level in 1954. Finland has been of strategic importance to the United States due to its position bordering the Soviet Union and later Russia, and after the end of the Cold War in 1991 Finland's shift to the West has led to warmer relations. There is significant trade activity, including military procurement, between the two countries. 
United States supports Finlanď's NATO membership.

History 

 

Diplomatic relations between the governments of Finland and the United States were established in 1920 at a legation level.

During the Second World War, although the Finnish government co-operated with the Axis Powers, relations were maintained. The U.S. government resisted Soviet pressures to declare war on Finland, but on June 30, 1944, it agreed to sever diplomatic relations with the Finnish government. After Finland had withdrawn from the war and acted against German troops in early 1945, the U.S. government reopened its legation in Helsinki on March 1, 1945. On August 20, 1945, negotiations were started between the two governments on re-establishing diplomatic relations, which was done on August 31.

Relations between the two countries were raised to embassy level on September 10, 1954.

Relations between the United States and Finland are warm. Some 270,000 U.S. citizens visit Finland annually, and about 6,000 U.S. citizens are residents there. The U.S. has an educational exchange program in Finland that is comparatively large for a Western European country of Finland's size. It is financed in part from a trust fund established in 1976 from Finland's final repayment of a U.S. loan made in the aftermath of World War I.

Finland is bordered on the east by Russia and, as one of the former Soviet Union's neighbors, has been of particular interest and importance to the U.S. both during the Cold War and in its aftermath. Before the Soviet Union dissolved in 1991, longstanding U.S. policy was to support Finnish neutrality and to maintain and reinforce Finland's historic, cultural, and economic ties with the West. The U.S. has welcomed Finland's increased participation since 1991 in Western economic and political structures.

In 2003, Anneli Jäätteenmäki of the Centre Party won the elections after she had accused her rival, Prime Minister Paavo Lipponen, of allying neutral Finland with the United States in the Iraq War during a meeting with U.S. President George W. Bush and thus associated Finland with what many Finns considered an illegal war of aggression. Lipponen denied the claims and declared, "We support the UN and the UN Secretary-General". Jäätteenmäki resigned as prime minister after 63 days in office amid accusations that she had lied about the leak of the documents about the meeting between Bush and Lipponen. That series of events was considered scandalous and it is named Iraq leak, or Iraqgate.

Economic and trade relations between Finland and the United States are active and were bolstered by the F-18 Hornet purchase. U.S.–Finland trade totals almost $5 billion annually. The U.S. receives about 7% of Finland's exports –  mainly pulp and paper, ships, machinery, electronics, instruments, and refined petroleum productsand provides about 7% of its importsprincipally computers, semiconductors, aircraft, machinery.
U.S. President Joe Biden approved the NATO membership of Finland and Sweden in August 2022.
Principal U.S. officials include
 Ambassador – Robert Pence
 Deputy Chief of Mission – Susan Elbow
 Public Affairs Counselor – Jeff Reneau
 Political-Economic Section Chief – Rodney Hunter
 Management Affairs – Steven Rider
 Commercial Section – Nicholas Kuchova
 Defense Attache – Colonel Scott Shugato
 Consular Officer – Susan Carl
 Regional Security Officer – Rick Gregory
 Agricultural Officer – Steve Huete (resident in The Hague)

Embassies 
The Embassy of the United States is located in Helsinki, Finland.  The Embassy of Finland is located in Washington, D.C.

Public opinion 
According to the 2012 U.S. Global Leadership Report, 48% of Finnish people approve of U.S. leadership, with 34% disapproving and 18% uncertain.

Cultural exchange between the United States and Finland 
The , a non-profit organization promoting cultural exchange between countries, operates in Finland. It have around 30 chapters in the country, e.g. in Helsinki, Turku, Oulu and Kuopio.

See also  
 Foreign relations of Finland 
 Foreign relations of the United States
 Accession of Finland to NATO
 Finnish Americans
 US–EU relations
 Finland–NATO relations
 European Union–NATO relations

References

Further reading
 Fields, Marek. "Reinforcing Finland's Attachment to the West: British and American Propaganda and Cultural Diplomacy in Finland, 1944-1962." (2015). Abstract
 Golubev, Alexey, and Irina Takala. The Search for a Socialist El Dorado: Finnish Immigration to Soviet Karelia from the United States and Canada in the 1930s (MSU Press, 2014)
 Hasan, Ali Ghafil. "US-Finland Economic Relations 1917-1945." Eurasian Journal of Humanities and Social Sciences 2 (2021): 28-34. online

 Jakobson, Max. The diplomacy of the winter war: an account of the Russo-Finnish War, 1939-1940 (Harvard Univ Press, 1961.)
 Rislakki, Jukka, "`Without Mercy': U.S. Strategic Intelligence and Finland in the Cold War," Journal of Military History, (Jan. 2015) 79#1 pp: 127–49. 
 Schwartz, Andrew J. America and the Russo-Finnish War (Public Affairs Press, 1960)
 Wargelin Brown, K. Marianne. "Finnish Americans." Gale Encyclopedia of Multicultural America, edited by Thomas Riggs, (3rd ed., vol. 2, Gale, 2014), pp. 137–151. online

External links
History of Finland - U.S. relations

 
Bilateral relations of the United States
United States